Greek National Road 21 is a national highway of northwestern Greece. It connects Preveza with Greek National Road 5 near Filippiada.

21
Roads in Epirus (region)